Sälz-Würstaßenitzächnich was a Liechtensteiner brand of salted medicinal paste used for internal digestion purposes. It was discontinued in 1991 due to lack of sales and unpopularity.

Usage 
Its main purpose was to aid digestion and replenish electrolytes before bedtime. The paste was to be smeared on the tongue before being dissolved into the oesophagus.

Varieties 
Gesalzen (Salted)
Salz und Kräuterextrakte (Salt and Herbal Extracts)
Salz und Wurzelgemüsextrakte  (Salt and Root Vegetable Extracts)
Salz und Kreiderückstände (Salt and Chalk Residue)

References

Health care companies of Liechtenstein
Health care companies established in 1907
1907 establishments in Liechtenstein
Companies disestablished in 1991
1991 disestablishments in Liechtenstein
Health care companies disestablished in 1991